The Directors Guild of America Award for Outstanding Directorial Achievement in Motion Pictures is one of the annual Directors Guild of America Awards presented by the Directors Guild of America. With 3 wins out of 13 nominations, Steven Spielberg is both the most awarded and most nominated director for this category in the history of DGA, and the first director to receive DGA nominations in six consecutive decades. Additionally, Alejandro G. Iñárritu is the only director to win twice successively; he was awarded in 2015 and 2016 for his directorial achievements for Birdman or (The Unexpected Virtue of Ignorance) and The Revenant, respectively. Three directing teams have shared the award: Robert Wise and Jerome Robbins for West Side Story (1961), Joel Coen and Ethan Coen for No Country for Old Men (2007), and Daniel Kwan and Daniel Scheinert for Everything Everywhere All at Once (2022).

Predicting the Oscar's outcome
This award has traditionally been a very good barometer for the Academy Award for Best Director. The DGA winner has always gone on to win the Oscar, with the exception of the following:

 1968 – Anthony Harvey (The Lion in Winter); lost to Carol Reed (Oliver!)
 1972 – Francis Ford Coppola (The Godfather); lost to Bob Fosse (Cabaret)
 1985 – Steven Spielberg (The Color Purple); lost to Sydney Pollack (Out of Africa); Spielberg was not nominated at the Oscars.
 1995 – Ron Howard (Apollo 13); lost to Mel Gibson (Braveheart); Howard was not nominated at the Oscars.
 2000 – Ang Lee (Crouching Tiger, Hidden Dragon); lost to Steven Soderbergh (Traffic)
 2002 – Rob Marshall (Chicago); lost to Roman Polanski (The Pianist)
 2012 – Ben Affleck (Argo); lost to Ang Lee (Life of Pi); Affleck was not nominated at the Oscars.
 2019 – Sam Mendes (1917); lost to Bong Joon-ho (Parasite)

Winners and nominees

1940s

1950s

1960s

1970s

1980s

1990s

2000s

2010s

2020s

Directors with multiple wins
3 wins
 Steven Spielberg

2 wins
 Francis Ford Coppola
 Alfonso Cuarón
 Clint Eastwood
 Miloš Forman
 Ron Howard
 Alejandro González Iñárritu (consecutive)
 David Lean
 Ang Lee
 Joseph L. Mankiewicz
 Sam Mendes
 George Stevens
 Oliver Stone
 Robert Wise
 Fred Zinnemann

Directors with multiple nominations
The following directors have received four or more nominations:

13 nominations
 Steven Spielberg

10 nominations
 Martin Scorsese

7 nominations
 Elia Kazan
 William Wyler
 Fred Zinnemann

6 nominations
 John Huston
 Billy Wilder

5 nominations
 Woody Allen
 Richard Brooks
 Francis Ford Coppola
 Stanley Donen
 Alfred Hitchcock
 Stanley Kubrick
 Sidney Lumet
 Robert Wise

4 nominations
 George Cukor
 Clint Eastwood
 David Fincher
 Ron Howard
 David Lean
 Ang Lee
 Joseph L. Mankiewicz
 Vincente Minnelli
 Robert Mulligan
 Christopher Nolan
 Ridley Scott
 George Stevens
 Peter Weir

See also
 BAFTA Award for Best Direction
 Academy Award for Best Director
 Golden Globe Award for Best Director
 Independent Spirit Award for Best Director
 Critics' Choice Movie Award for Best Director
 Cannes Film Festival Award for Best Director

References

External links
 

Directors Guild of America Awards